Roncal (Erronkariko gazta in Basque) is a hard, creamy sheep milk cheese. It is made in one of seven villages in the Valle de Roncal of Spain. Roncal enjoys  PDO status.

References

External links
 artisanalcheese.com 

Sheep's-milk cheeses
Basque cuisine
Spanish cheeses
Spanish products with protected designation of origin